Arthur Campbell Thomson (2 September 1948 – 7 March 2002) was a Scottish footballer, who played as a central defender in the Football League. He was born in Edinburgh.

References

External links

1948 births
2002 deaths
Scottish footballers
Footballers from Edinburgh
Association football central defenders
Heart of Midlothian F.C. players
Oldham Athletic A.F.C. players
Raith Rovers F.C. players
English Football League players
Dalkeith Thistle F.C. players
Chelsea F.C. players
Scotland under-23 international footballers